Donald Willard Devore Jr. is an American artist and curator, known as Don Devore, who has been a member of the bands Ink & Dagger, Frail, Rain on the Parade, The Icarus Line, Lilys, Amazing Baby, Historics, Vague Angels, and Souls She Said, among others. He is currently performing as a solo artist and as a member of the band Collapsing Scenery.

Selected Discography
With Collapsing Scenery
2015 Metaphysical Cops (Can Break Physical Bones) (12' single) 
 2016 Deep State (7-inch EP) 
2016 God's Least Favorite (12-inch EP)
2016 The Cat Looks At The King (7-inch single)
2017 Straight World Problems (12-inch single) 
2017 Money (Feat. Ninjaman) (12-inch single) 
2018 Let's Burn Down the Cornfield / Modern World (7-inch single) 
2019 Resort Beyond the Last Resort (10-inch single) 

With Sick Feeling
 2015 Suburban Myth 

With Historics
 2009 Strategies For Apprehension 

With Amazing Baby
 2009 Rewild 

With Ghost Note
 2008 Holy Jungle 12-inch

With Vague Angels
 2007 Truth Loved  

With Giant Drag
 2005 Hearts and Unicorns

With The Icarus Line
2004 Penance Soiree
2007 Black Lives at the Golden Coast

With Souls She Said
2003 Rub The Sleep Out EP
2006 As Templar Nites

With Lilys
2000 Selected EP 
2003 Precollection 

With Ink & Dagger
Drive This Seven-Inch Wooden Stake Through My Philadelphia Heart (Initial Records)
Experiments In Nocturnal Sound and Energy (Revelation Records)
Sensations EP
The Fine art of Original Sin LP  
Ink and Dagger S/T LP

With Rain on The Parade
1996 Body Bag EP

With The Mandela Strikeforce
1995 The Sound Of The Revolution In Stereo 

With Frail
 2000 Make Your Own Noise
 1993 Frail

As producer 
 Super Unison – Stella (2018)

Footnotes

External links
 Sick Feeling BrooklynVegan article
 Official Website of Amazing Baby
Don Devore at Discogs

 An interview from ilikemusic.com

Living people
American rock bass guitarists
Lead guitarists
American male bass guitarists
Lilys members
The Icarus Line members
Year of birth missing (living people)